The chestnut-capped blackbird (Chrysomus ruficapillus) is a species of bird in the family Icteridae. It is found in Argentina, Bolivia, Brazil, French Guiana, Paraguay, and Uruguay, where its natural habitats are swamps, ricefields and pastureland. The International Union for Conservation of Nature rates its conservation status as "least concern".

Description

The chestnut-capped blackbird is sexually dimorphic. It has a straight dark-coloured beak with a sharp tip, and dark legs. The male has a chestnut-coloured head and throat but is otherwise glossy black; birds in the southern part of the range have darker heads than those in the north. The upper parts of the female are a dark olive-brown, slightly streaked with black, and the underparts are paler olive-brown; the streaking on the back of this species is less distinct than in other birds in this genus. The voice consists of various trills and whistles, the song being a lengthy "chree-chree-churrr".

Distribution
Its range covers much of the Amazon Basin and extends from northern Brazil to northern Argentina. It is found in the vicinity of water, in marshes, in nearby grassland and in rice fields.

Status
The population of the chestnut-capped blackbird has not been quantified but appears to be stable. The bird has an extremely wide range and is reported as being common, and the International Union for Conservation of Nature has assessed its conservation status as being of "least concern".

References

chestnut-capped blackbird
Birds of South America
Birds of the Pantanal
Birds of Brazil
chestnut-capped blackbird
Taxa named by Louis Jean Pierre Vieillot
Taxonomy articles created by Polbot